Richard Bok is a Singaporean soccer coach and former football player. He is currently Head Coach Serangoon Centre with ActiveSG Football Academy. Bok is the most successful coach in the history of Singapore's S.League. He has led SAFFC to winning the S.League title four times, in 2006, 2007, 2008 and 2009, as well as the Singapore Cup in 2007, 2008 and 2012. Bok won the S.League's Coach of the Year award in 2006, 2007 and 2009.

Football career

Club career 
In 1996, Bok joined SAFFC in the S.League when the league was first started. In 1997, he suffered a stroke which left him with blurred vision and ended his playing career.

Coaching career 
After his stroke, Bok became an assistant coach at SAFFC for eight years. In May 2006, three months after the 2006 S.League season has started, SAFFC's head coach Peter Butler left after falling out with the club management and SAFFC's general manager Kok Wai Leong let Bok took over as caretaker coach.

In Asian Football Confederation Club Competitions, he led SAFFC to 2 Quarter Finals in 2007 & 2008 AFC Cup. In 2009, he made history by leading SAFFC into the AFC Champions League group stages by defeating PEA of Thailand & PSMS Medan of Indonesia in the East playoff. SAFFC made Singapore football history by being the first team in Singapore to qualify for the premier club tournament in Asia. In the 2009 AFC Champions League Group stage, SAFFC were grouped with J League Champion Kashima Antlers of Japan, K-League Champion Suwon Samsung Bluewings of Korea and Chinese Super League runners up Shanghai Shenhua of China. SAFFC were last in the group with 1 point from a draw with Shanghai Shenhua of China, played at Jalan Besar stadium in Singapore.

In 2010, he led SAFFC to their 2nd successive AFC Champions League Group stage by defeating Sriwijaya of Indonesia 3–0 at Jalan Besar stadium in Singapore and won the playoff final in Singapore against Muang Thong Utd FC of Thailand on penalties. This time, they were grouped with the 2009 winner of the tournament Gamba Osaka of Japan, Henan Jianye of China and again Suwon Samsung Bluewings of Korea. This time round, Richard led his team to their first ever away point with a draw in Henan, China against Henan Jianye, thus equalling the one point they had in 2009. But they went one better with their first ever historical AFC Champions League win on 13 April 2010 at Jalan Besar stadium in Singapore with a 2–1 victory over Henan Jianye. Thus finishing 3rd in the group ahead of big team of Chinese Super League Henan Jianye. This campaign put SAFFC and Singapore football on the map in Asia football.

Bok is currently Head Coach Serangoon Centre with ActiveSG Football Academy.

Coaching Qualification
Bok has a AFC Professional Diploma Coaching License.

AFC Regional Instructor Course

Coaching Honours
S.League Championship Winner : 2006, 2007, 2008, 2009
Singapore Cup Champion : 2007, 2008, 2012
Singapore Charity Shield Winner : 2008, 2010
AFC Champions League East Playoff Winner : 2009, 2010
AFC Champions League Groups stage : 2009, 2010
AFC Cup Quarter Final : 2007, 2008
AFF Asean Club Championship Quarter Final : 2003 (as Caretaker Coach)
S.League Coach Of The Year Winner : 2006, 2007, 2009

Coaching records in all competitions

All Competition as of 1 November 2012

References

5. http://www.goal.com/en-sg/news/3883/features/2012/10/24/3462955/one-on-one-the-man-who-came-in-from-the-dark-richard-boks

6. http://www.todayonline.com/sports/football/who-might-be-next-lionsxii-head-coach

Singaporean footballers
Singapore international footballers
Singaporean sportspeople of Chinese descent
1969 births
Living people
Singaporean football managers
Singapore Premier League head coaches
Warriors FC head coaches
Association footballers not categorized by position